Ilinca Dalina Amariei (born 30 July 2002) is a Romanian tennis player.

Amariei has a career-high singles ranking of 658 by the WTA, achieved on 31 October. She also has a career-high WTA doubles ranking of 605, achieved on 31 October 2022. Amariei has won two singles and five doubles titles on the ITF Circuit. 

Amariei made her WTA Tour main-draw debut at the 2021 Transylvania Open, where she received a wildcard into the doubles tournament, partnering Briana Szabó.

ITF Circuit finals

Singles: 2 (2 titles)

Doubles: 7 (5 titles, 2 runner-ups)

References

External links
 
 

2002 births
Living people
Romanian female tennis players
Sportspeople from Iași